Generalized eruptive histiocytoma (also known as "Eruptive histiocytoma," and "Generalized eruptive histiocytosis") is a rare cutaneous condition characterized by widespread, erythematous, essentially symmetrical papules, particularly involving the trunk and proximal extremities.

See also 
 Non-X histiocytosis
 List of cutaneous conditions

References

External links 

Monocyte- and macrophage-related cutaneous conditions